The American Journal of Psychoanalysis is a healthcare journal covering psychoanalysis.

Abstracting and indexing 
The American Journal of Psychoanalysis is abstracted and indexed in Scopus.

See also 
 List of psychotherapy journals

References

Psychotherapy journals
English-language journals
Publications established in 1941
Quarterly journals
Psychoanalysis journals
Palgrave Macmillan academic journals